was a Japanese professional 7 dan Go player.

Biography
Born 1810, Akaboshi rose to prominence as a student of Inoue Genan Inseki, head of the House of Inoue. By 1834, the former had attained the rank of 7 dan.

Genan desired the prestigious position of the Meijin godokoro, but was unsuccessful as a result of political manoeuvres by Honinbo Jowa. Instead, the title and office were obtained by Jowa with the aid of Hayashi Gembi, an ally within the government. In response, Genan sought to use Akaboshi, his prodigy, in an attempt to embarrass Jowa into retirement.

The "Blood-vomiting game" was the famous match between Akaboshi, 7 dan as black, and Jowa, 9 dan as white. It took place at the Matsudaira Go Party from 13–21 August 1835. Black succeeded in building an early lead, utilising one of House Inoue's secret taisha joseki. However, Jowa played a sequence of three brilliant tesuji that turned the tide of the match in his favour, ultimately leading to black's resignation after 246 moves. According to Invincible, Akaboshi's health was already in decline when the game began, but after it had ended he coughed up blood over the board and collapsed.

On 19 October 1835, Akaboshi died of tuberculosis.

Publications

Akaboshi authored the Genran, a collection of tsumego, published in 1833. It features a total of 69 problems, with the first turn alternating between black and white.

References

1810 births
1835 deaths
Japanese Go players
Go (game) writers
People from Kumamoto Prefecture
19th-century deaths from tuberculosis
Tuberculosis deaths in Japan
19th-century Go players